Mensa may refer to:
Mensa International, an organization for people with a high intelligence quotient (IQ)
Mensa (name), a name and list of people with the given name or surname
Mensa (constellation), a constellation in the southern sky
Mensa (ecclesiastical), a portion of church property that is appropriated to defray the expenses of either the prelate or the community that serves the church
Mensa (geology), an extraterrestrial area of raised land